The  is a kofun burial mound located in the city of Gyōda, Saitama Prefecture, in the Kantō region of Japan. The tumulus was designated a National Historic Site in 1938 and re-designated as a Special National Historic Site of Japan in 2020 as part of the Sakitama Kofun Cluster.

Overview
The Atagoyama Kofun has a total length of 53 meters, and is the smallest tumulus in the Saitama Kofun Cluster. As with the other keyhole-shaped tumuli in this cluster, the Atagoyama Kofun had a rectangular double moat. A large number of haniwa have been excavated from this tumulus, including haniwa shaped as cylinders, "morning-glory", houses, horses, men with swords, and other male figures. The tumulus dates from the middle of the 6th century AD. The burial chamber has not been excavated as the mound was in very poor repair and was in danger of collapsing. Its name comes from an Atago Shrine which was once located on the tumulus.

The Atagoyama Kofun is near the parking lot to the Sakitama Kofun archaeological park, and is adjacent  to the Gyōda Futagoyama Kofun, the largest kofun  in the cluster. 

Overall length 53 meters
Posterior circular portion 30 meter diameter x 3.4 meter high
Anterior rectangular portion 30 meters wide x 3.3 meters high

See also
List of Historic Sites of Japan (Saitama)

References

External links

Gyoda city home page 
Museum of the Sakitama Ancient Burial Mounds 

Kofun
Archaeological sites in Japan
History of Saitama Prefecture
Gyōda
Historic Sites of Japan